This is a list of the 42 comarques (singular comarca) into which Catalonia is divided. A comarca is a group of municipalities, roughly equivalent to a county in the US or a district or council in the UK. However, in the context of Catalonia, the term "county" can be a bit misleading, because in medieval Catalonia, aside from the kings of Aragon, the most important rulers were counts, notably the Counts of Barcelona and of Urgell. Comarques have no particular relation to the "counties" that were ruled by counts.

Overview

Although today the comarques are officially defined under a Catalan parliamentary act, for centuries they had existed unofficially, with citizens identifying with a particular comarca in the same way that people in other parts of the world might identify with a particular region.

In some cases, comarques consist of rural areas and many small villages centring on an important town, where the people of the region traditionally go to shop or to sell their goods. This is the case of comarques such as the Pla d'Estany, centred on the town of Banyoles, or the Ripollès, centred on the town of Ripoll. In other cases, comarques are larger areas with many important population centres that have traditionally been considered part of the same region, as in the case of the Empordà or Vallès.

The current official division of Catalonia into comarques originates in an order of the semi-autonomous Catalan government under the Spanish Republic in 1936. It was superseded after the 1939 victory of Francisco Franco's forces in the Spanish Civil War, but restored in 1987 by the re-established Generalitat of Catalonia. Since the definition of comarques is traditionally a non-official and sometimes ambiguous, many new proposals have been made since the comarques were first officially designated as different towns attempt to adjust the official comarques with what they consider to be their traditional comarca. As a result, some revisions to the official division have been made periodically.

The comarca exists as a local government area, and has a representative comarcal council.

Borders of comarques generally do not cross those of provinces (Barcelona, Girona, Lleida, Tarragona), but there are several exceptions, since the provinces are defined by the Spanish government, while comarques are defined by the Catalan government - notably in the case of Cerdanya which is split into two between the provinces of Lleida and Girona (most other cases involve only one or two municipalities).

Aran, which is included here, is officially not a comarca but a "unique territorial entity" with additional powers, but unofficially it is generally referred to as a comarca. Its current status was formalised in February 2015.

List of comarques

Comarcal revisions 
Comarcal revisions have taken place in 1988 (creation of Pla d'Estany, Pla d'Urgell, and Alta Ribagorça), 1990 (various adjustments), and May 2015 (creation of Moianès). The Catalan government's "Report on the revision of Catalonia's territorial organisation model" (the ), published in 2000, recommends many more changes to comarques, which have not yet been adopted except for the 2015 creation of Moianès.

In a non-binding referendum in July 2015, a majority of municipalities of the Lluçanès region of Osona voted to join a proposed new comarca of that name. The partial approval was seen as insufficient, and the plan had not been put to parliament by the end of 2015.

Historical comarques 

There are some other comarques which are often referred to as historical comarques of Catalonia, because their present territory was part of the former Principality of Catalonia, but they are now in Northern Catalonia, part of France.

See also 
 Comarcas of Spain
 Vegueria - proposed structure for grouping comarcas
 Municipalities of Catalonia
 Provinces of Spain
 Local government in Spain

Footnotes

References

External links
 The Institut d'Estadística de Catalunya is an excellent source of statistical information for Catalonia, down to the level of individual municipalities. It is also our source for which municipalities are in which comarca. Parts of the site are in English and Spanish, although most of it is in Catalan.
 History of present comarcal division. Catalonia, La Franja and Northern Catalonia.